The 1998 Copa Colsanitas was a women's tennis tournament played on outdoor clay courts at the Club Campestre El Rancho in Bogotá in Colombia that was part of Tier IV of the 1998 WTA Tour. The tournament was held from 16 February through 22 February 1998. Unseeded Paola Suárez won the singles title.

Finals

Singles

 Paola Suárez defeated  Sonya Jeyaseelan 6–3, 6–4
 It was Suárez's 2nd title of the year and the 3rd of her career.

Doubles

 Janette Husárová /  Paola Suárez defeated  Melissa Mazzotta /  Ekaterina Sysoeva 3–6, 6–2, 6–3
 It was Husárová's only title of the year and the 4th of her career. It was Suárez's 3rd title of the year and the 4th of her career.

External links
 Official website
 WTA Tournament Profile

Copa Colsanitas
Copa Colsanitas
1998 in Colombian tennis